Encyclopedia Mythica is an online encyclopedia that seeks to cover folklore, mythology, and religion. This encyclopedia was founded in June 1995 as a small site with about 300 entries, and established with its own domain name in March 1996. As of May 2021, it features more than 11000 articles.

References

External links
 Encyclopedia Mythica

Online encyclopedias
21st-century encyclopedias